Merino is an economically influential breed of sheep prized for its wool.

Merino may also refer to:

Places
 Merino, Colorado, United States
 Irvington, Kentucky, United States, formerly known as Merino
 Mount Merino, Kentucky, United States, near Irvington
 Merino, Victoria, Australia
 Merinos, Uruguay

Other uses
 Merino (surname), including a list of people with the name
 English Merino, a guinea pig breed
 The Big Merino, a 15-metre tall concrete merino sheep located in Goulburn, New South Wales, Australia

See also
Marino (disambiguation)
Merindad, a medieval Spanish municipality run by a merino